Aleksandr Nikolayevich Korkin (– ) was a Russian mathematician. He made contribution to the development of partial differential equations, and was second only to Chebyshev among the founders of the Saint Petersburg Mathematical School. Among others, his students included Yegor Ivanovich Zolotarev.

Some publications

References

External links

Korkin's Biography, the St. Petersburg University Pages (in Russian, but with an image)

1837 births
1908 deaths
People from Vologda Oblast
People from Vologda Governorate
19th-century mathematicians from the Russian Empire
Mathematical analysts